Narvik Arctic Eagles is an ice hockey team in Narvik, Norway. They currently play in the 1.division, the 2. level of Norwegian ice hockey.

History
The club was founded in 1962. In the 2011–12 season, they participated in the Swedish Division 3, the fifth level of ice hockey in Sweden. They joined the Norwegian First Division for the 2012–13 season.

In the season 17/18 they became first divisjon champions and qualified for playoffs for Get Ligaen(Top division). They ended up on 3rd place in a playoff tournament consisting of the last and second to last teams in the Get ligaen (Stjernen Hockey and Kongsvinger Knights) and the 2nd place in first division(Ringerike Panthers)

End result playoffs qualification to Get Ligaen 17/18
1st Stjernen hockey (religated)
2nd Ringerike Panthers (Religated)
3rd Narvik Hockey (Stays in 1 division)
4th Kongsvinger Knights(Demoted to first division)

External links
Official website
Team profile on eurohockey.com

Ice hockey teams in Norway
Ice hockey clubs established in 1962
Sport in Nordland
Narvik
1962 establishments in Norway